Klecie  is a village in the administrative district of Gmina Stare Pole, within Malbork County, Pomeranian Voivodeship, in northern Poland. 

The village has a population of 79.

Notable residents
 Hans Wiehler (1930–2003), German botanist

References

Villages in Malbork County